Network computing is a generic term in computing which refers to computers or nodes working together over a network.

The two basic models of computing are:

1- centralized computing:- where computing is done at a central location, using terminals that are attached to a central computer.

2- decentralized computing:-  where computing is done at  various individual station  or location and each system have power to run independently.

It may also mean:
Cloud computing, a kind of Internet-based computing that provides shared processing resources and data to devices on demand
Distributed computing
Virtual Network Computing